The Social Right (La Droite sociale) is a recognized movement within the Union for a Popular Movement (UMP). It was created as an informal club and think-tank by Laurent Wauquiez, mayor of Le Puy-en-Velay (Haute-Loire) and a former cabinet minister.

History and ideology

The Social Right was created in 2011 by Laurent Wauquiez and other UMP parliamentarians who wanted to emphasize the right's social policy, appeal to the middle-class and break the left's purported domination of social policy. It placed large emphasis on fighting welfare dependency, denounced as a "cancer" by Wauquiez.

The Social Right proposed to condition a part of the Revenu de solidarité active to unpaid voluntary work and explored the possibility of reserving social housing to those currently employed.

Weight within the UMP

As a motion for the November 2012 congress, the Social Right placed second with 21.69% of the motions vote.

Leadership and supporters

The movement's leader is Laurent Wauquiez, a filloniste deputy for the Haute-Loire and mayor of Le Puy-en-Velay.

Parliamentarians which co-signed the motion included: Brigitte Barèges, Caroline Cayeux, Damien Abad, Gérard Cherpion and Yves Nicolin. Parliamentarians could co-sign more than one motion.

References

External links
Official website

 
Political party factions in France
Factions and associate parties of the Union for a Popular Movement